This is a list of female United States military generals and flag officers, that are either currently serving in the U.S. Armed Forces, or are retired. They are listed under their respective service branches, which make up the Department of Defense, with the exception of the Coast Guard, which is part of Homeland Security. 


U.S. Army generals

 Clara Leach Adams-Ender
 Robin B. Akin
 Marcia Anderson
 Patricia M. Anslow
 Deborah A. Ashenhurst
 Donna Feigley Barbisch
 Maria B. Barrett
 Kris A. Belanger
 Marti J. Bissell
 Aida T. Borras
 Tina B. Boyd
 Heidi Brown
 Margaret Burcham
 Rosetta Burke
 Sherian Cadoria 
 Mary E. Clarke
 Johanna P. Clyborne
 Kimberly M. Colloton
 Rhonda Cornum
 Telita Crosland
 Flora D. Darpino
 Jody J. Daniels
 Barbara Doornink
 B. Sue Dueitt
 Ann E. Dunwoody
 Karen E. Dyson
 Mari K. Eder
 Jeanette Edmunds
 Jill K. Faris
 Gina Farrisee
 Cheryn L. Fasano
 Barbara Fast
 Robin Fontes
 Pat Foote
 Kristin French
 Maria Gervais
 Karen Gibson
 Rebecca S. Halstead
 Carla Hawley-Bowland
 Anna Mae Hays
 Susan E. Henderson
 Patricia Hickerson
 Elizabeth P. Hoisington
 Barbara R. Holcomb
 Diana M. Holland
 Heidi J. Hoyle
 Hazel Johnson-Brown  
 Claudia J. Kennedy
 Deborah Kotulich
 Susan Lawrence
 Mary-Kate Leahy
 Michelle Letcher
 Paula Lodi
 Anne F. Macdonald
 Donna W. Martin
 Colleen L. McGuire
 Patricia E. McQuistion
 Dee Ann McWilliams
 Jennifer Napper
 Camille M. Nichols
 Belinda Pinckney
 Coral Wong Pietsch 
 Gale Pollock
 Laura A. Potter
 Lee Price
 Hope C. Rampy
 Laura J. Richardson
 Michelle M. Rose
 Dianne M. Del Rosso
 Miyako N. Schanley
 Michelle A. Schmidt
 Jami C. Shawley
 Dustin A. Shultz
 Tammy Smith
 Tracy L. Smith
 Joyce L. Stevens
 Loree K. Sutton
 Suzanne Vares-Lum
 Nadja West
 Myrna H. Williamson
 Mary Willis
 Laura Yeager
 Irene M. Zoppi

U.S. Marine Corps generals 

 Margaret A. Brewer 
 Tracy L. Garrett
 Lorna Mahlock 
 Marcela Monahan
 Carol Mutter 
 Julie Nethercot
 Helen Pratt
 Gail M. Reals
 Lori Reynolds
 Angela Salinas
 Roberta L. Shea
 Frances C. Wilson

U.S. Navy admirals 

 Sandra E. Adams
 Kelly Aeschbach
 Christina M. Alvarado
 Annie B. Andrews
 Jacqueline O. Barnes
 Danelle Barrett
 Linda J. Bird
 Babette Bolivar
 Raquel C. Bono
 Robin Braun
 Annette E. Brown
 Nancy Elizabeth Brown
 Paula C. Brown
 Christine Bruzek-Kohler
 Wendi B. Carpenter
 Shoshana S. Chatfield
 Priscilla B. Coe
 Althea H. Coetzee
 Maxine Conder
 Cynthia A. Covell
 Kathleen Creighton
 Donna L. Crisp
 Dawn E. Cutler
 Sandy L. Daniels
 Yvette M. Davids
 Nanette M. DeRenzi
 Janet R. Donovan
 Marianne B. Drew
 Alene B. Duerk
 Ann Duff
 Cynthia A. Dullea
 Kathleen M. Dussault
 Joan Marie Engel
 Marsha J. Evans
 Nancy A. Fackler
 Lillian E. Fishburne
 Karen Flaherty
 Moira N. Flanders
 Lisa Franchetti
 Ronne Froman
 Ann D. Gilbride
 Robin L. Graf
 Katherine L. Gregory
 Alma M. Grocki
 Mary F. Hall
 Janice M. Hamby
 Karen A. Harmeyer
 Pauline Hartington
 Deborah P. Haven
 Roberta L. Hazard
 Martha E. G. Herb
 Gretchen S. Herbert
 Elizabeth A. Hight
 Grace Hopper
 Michelle J. Howard
 Valerie K. Huegel
 Christine S. Hunter
 Maryanne T. Ibach
 Mary M. Jackson
 Cindy L. Jaynes
 Sara A. Joyner
 Margaret G. Kibben
 Margaret D. Klein
 Nancy S. Lacore
 Katharine L. Laughton
 Nancy J. Lescavage
 Rosanne M. Levitre
 Deborah Loewer
 Eleanor Mariano
 Kathleen L. Martin
 Rebecca J. McCormick-Boyle
 Barbara E. McGann
 Fran McKee
 Elizabeth M. Morris
 Mary Joan Nielubowicz
 Elizabeth S. Niemyer
 Nancy A. Norton
 Kathleen Paige
 Ann Claire Phillips
 Carol M. Pottenger
 Bonnie Burnham Potter
 Sharon H. Redpath
 Ann E. Rondeau
 Margaret A. Rykowski
 Frances Shea-Buckley
 Michelle C. Skubic
 Mariann Stratton
 Anne Swap
 Barbara Sweredoski
 Cynthia Thebaud
 Jan Tighe
 Patricia A. Tracey
 Elizabeth L. Train
 Carol I. Turner
 Nora W. Tyson
 Eleanor V. Valentin
 Elaine C. Wagner
 Diane E. H. Webber
 Louise C. Wilmot
 Patricia E. Wolfe
 Maude Elizabeth Young

U.S. Air Force generals

 Elizabeth E. Arledge
 Rosanne Bailey
 Margaret H. Bair
 Maureen G. Banavige
 Sharon Bannister
 Lee Ann T. Bennett
 Dana H. Born
 Angela M. Cadwell
 Kimberly A. Crider
 Susan Y. Desjardins
 Dawne Deskins
 Sharon K.G. Dunbar
 Dawn M. Dunlop
 Michele C. Edmondson
 Judith Fedder
 Terry Gabreski
 Anita R. Gallentine
 Kristin E. Goodwin
 Sandra A. Gregory
 Gina Grosso
 Stayce Harris
 Lynnette J. Hebert
 Susan Helms
 Dorothy A. Hogg
 Jeanne M. Holm
 VeraLinn Jamieson
 Michelle D. Johnson
 Leslie F. Kenne
 Jill Lannan
 Jeannie Leavitt
 Leah G. Lauderback
 Laura Lenderman
 Pamela J. Lincoln
 Linda M. Marsh
 Susan K. Mashiko
 K.C. McClain
 Maryanne Miller
 Mary F. O'Brien
 Susan Lewellyn Pamerleau
 Ellen M. Pawlikowski
 Susan J. Pietrykowski
 Lorraine K. Potter
 Martha Rainville
 Lori Robinson
 Patricia Rose
Jocelyn M. Seng
 Donna D. Shipton
 Allyson R. Solomon
 Andrea Tullos
 Linda Urrutia-Varhall
 Jacqueline Van Ovost
 Carmelita Vigil-Schimmenti 
 Janet C. Wolfenbarger
 Margaret H. Woodward
 Sheila Zuehlke

U.S. National Guard generals

 Robyn J. Blader
 Marta Carcana 
 Kathleen E. Fick
 Joane Mathews
 Marianne Mathewson-Chapman
 Linda L. Singh

U.S. Space Force generals 

 Nina M. Armagno
 DeAnna M. Burt

U.S. Coast Guard admirals 

 Meredith L. Austin
 Melissa Bert
 Jody A. Breckenridge
 Sally Brice-O'Hara
 Donna L. Cottrell
 Vivien Crea 
 Laura M. Dickey
 Megan Dean
 Linda Fagan 
 Mary Landry
 Joanna Nunan
 Mary P. O'Donnell
 Erica Schwartz 
 Sandra L. Stosz
 Cari Batson Thomas

See also 
 General officers in the United States

General ☆☆☆☆
Lieutenant General ☆☆☆
Major General ☆☆
Brigadier General ☆
 Flag officers in the United States

Admiral ☆☆☆☆
Vice Admiral ☆☆☆
Rear Admiral ☆☆
Rear Admiral  ☆

References

External links 
 Army General Officer Management Office 
Biographies of senior Navy leaders and flag officers
 Biographies of retired Navy flag officers

United States Female
United States Female Military generals
 
Lists of female office-holders
United States female